Miguel Benjamin Lebrón-Laboy (born March 31, 1934, Yabucoa, Puerto Rico), is a Puerto Rican professional pool player nicknamed "Spanish Mike".

Lebrón currently lives in Philadelphia, Pennsylvania and actively competes at various pocket billiards events.

Professional career 
Lebrón is the winner of the thirteenth edition of the U.S. Open 9-ball Championship. Lebrón won the title against Nick Varner in 1988 and is the only Puerto Rican-born professional pool player to win a major title.  He is also the oldest pool player to have ever won the US Open 9-Ball Championship at the age of 54 years old. In 1991, Lebrón won the International Challenge of Champions defeating Buddy Hall in the final match. Lebrón won $50,000, which was the largest first place prize in a pool tournament at the time.

On February 19, 2006, in his hometown of Yabucoa, Puerto Rico, Lebrón was inducted into the Yabucoa Sports Hall of Fame (Pabellón de la Fama del Deporte Yabucoeño). The induction ceremonies took place on June 11, 2006.

Lebrón is a member of the International Pool Tour.

Titles and achievements
 2006 Yabucoa Sports Hall of Fame 
 1992 Glass City Open 9-Ball
 1991 International Challenge of Champions
 1990 Glass City Open 9-Ball
 1989 Rak'em Up 9-Ball Classic Seniors 
 1988 U.S. Open 9-ball Championship
 1988 Pool Hall Classic Open 9-Ball
 1986 Suncoast Open 9-Ball

References

External links 
 Mike Lebron's homepage 
 

1934 births
Living people
People from Yabucoa, Puerto Rico
Puerto Rican pool players